This is a list of crime films released in 2000.

References

2000s
2000-related lists